Laura Podestà (21 April 1954 – 20 December 2022) was an Italian swimmer. She competed in three events at the 1972 Summer Olympics.

References

External links
 

1954 births
2022 deaths
Italian female swimmers
Olympic swimmers of Italy
Swimmers at the 1972 Summer Olympics
Swimmers from Milan